The Holy Week in Braga is the most imposing, attractive and famous among all in Portugal, and the most important tourist and religious event in the city of Braga. It is estimated that about 100.000 people attend the major processions. It combines harmoniously elements of the liturgy and of popular piety, ancient traditions and innovation. Since November 2011, this event is officially “Declared of Interest to Tourism”.

Historical origin 
Most likely the Holy Week in Braga has its historical origin in the late 4th century. As others, presupposes the peace given to the Church by Emperor Constantine in 313, and the determinations of the Council of Nicaea on the celebration of Easter. The first major testimony of the celebration of Holy week in Jerusalem, and the likely start of his imitation in multiple other places in the Christian world, is the travelogue Peregrinatio ad Loca Sancta or Itinerarium ad Loca Sancta (Pilgrimage / Itinerary to Holy Places) or, simply, Itinerarium Egeriae (Itinerary of Egeria) written by Egeria or Aetheria. This pilgrim was a woman of Gallaecia, probably even of Bracara Augusta (nowadays the city of Braga), that made his own pilgrimage to the Holy Land between 381 and 384. Her piece of writing, which describes in detail the celebrations then made in Jerusalem, has probably inspired similar celebrations in other parts of the world. Braga, for obvious reasons, may have been among the first and have been even a center for irradiation. Its historical evolution throughout the Middle Ages is unknown. But likely their settings from the beginnings of the modern age, about which there are documents, have behind them a millennial tradition.

Promotion and organization 
The Holy Week in Braga is promoted by the Cathedral Chapter, in partnership with the brotherhoods of Mercy and of Holy Cross, and with the City Council of Braga, the Oporto and North of Portugal Tourism Organization and the Commercial Association of Braga. It is organized by a Committee made up of representatives of these institutions and by some people in a personal capacity. It has the collaboration of the parish and the autarchy of St. Victor.

Cultural and spiritual preparation 
The spiritual preparation during Lent includes the mass and the imposition of Ashes at the Cathedral, the opening and the permanence of the Lenten “Lausperene” in churches of Braga, the Lenten conferences by the Archbishop Primate, three Stations of the Cross and three Lenten conferences at the Holy Cross Church, a procession of penitence to the “Bom Jesus do Monte” and a penitential celebration in the Cathedral with occurrence of confessions. This spiritual preparation is completed in cultural ambiance, with a series of concerts of religious music, several thematic exhibitions and some shows on Passion or Easter themes.

Holy Week day by day 

Friday before Palm Sunday
 Choral Symphonic Concert in the St. Marc Church

Saturday before Palm Sunday
 Procession with transfer of the platform (“andor”) with the “Senhor dos Passos” (Christ carrying the cross), from the Holy Cross Church to the St. Paul Church.
 Popular stations of the cross, through the “calvários”.

Palm Sunday
 Morning: blessing and procession of the Palms (St. Paul's Church).
 Morning: solemn mass of Palm Sunday (Cathedral).
 Afternoon: Steps Procession (“Procissão dos Passos”).

Monday
 Choral Symphonic Concert in the Holy Cross Church.

Tuesday
 Choral Symphonic Concert in the Cathedral.

Wednesday
 Night: Biblical Pageant “You shall be my people” (Our Lady of the “burrinha" Procession).

Thursday
 Morning: Chrism mass and blessing of Holy oils (Cathedral).
 Afternoon: Washing of feet and Mass of the institution of the Eucharist (Lord's Supper).
 Night: Lord “Ecce Homo” Procession.

Friday
 Morning: Lauds Office (Morning Prayer) and penitential celebration (Cathedral).
 Afternoon: Lord's Death commemoration (Cathedral) and “Teofórica” Procession (Cathedral).
 Night: Lord's Burial's Procession.

Saturday
 Morning: Lauds Office and penitential celebration (Cathedral).
 Night: Solemn Easter Vigil (Cathedral) and Resurrection Procession (Cathedral).

Sunday
 Morning: Easter Sunday Solemn mass (Cathedral).
 During the day: Pascal visit.

Processions and stations of the cross

Transfer of the “Steps Lord” 
It is a simple procession in which the image of the “Senhor dos Passos” (Steps Lord) is transferred from the Holy Cross's church to the St. Paul's church, where, the next day, will come out in Steps Procession. After this procession, follows the popular stations of the cross, travelling by eight “stations” or “calvários” dispersed across the city. Between the stations the people sing a popular and very old song, known as the song of the “martírios” (martyrdom's song).

Palms Procession 
Liturgical procession, where the crowd of participants actively integrates with palms and olive branches, previously blessed, chanting songs of “hossana” to Jesus Christ to remember his triumphal entry into Jerusalem.

Steps Procession 
Organized by the brotherhood of the Holy Cross, this runs through the city's streets in order to go through all the “calvários”, which represent the main Stations of the Cross. The processions also symbolises, in allegorical paintings and dramatic scenarios, the same events of the Mass of Palms that were read in the Gospel of the Passion. Within this processions parade the figures involved in the trial, condemnation and death of Jesus: soldiers, executioners and enemies; but also friendly Cyrenians, repentant Magdalenes and pious women. Jesus himself, the “Lord of the Steps”, carrying the cross, goes through the city streets, as the original went through Jerusalem. Next to the Holy Cross church is pronounced the “Sermon of the encounter” and, in the course of this, listeners attend the emotional encounter of Jesus with his grievous Mother, the "Lady of Sorrows”.

Biblical pageant “You shall be my people” (Our Lady of “little ass" Procession) 
Organized since 1998, by the parish and by the autarchy of S. Victor, this eloquent pageant presents the prehistory of the Paschal mystery of Jesus that the Church celebrates during the next days. Starting at the call of Abraham, passing by the age of the Patriarchs, from the slavery in Egypt and the epic release by Moses (prefiguration of Christ) until Jesus childhood – including his escape into that country with Joseph and Mary, mounted on a little ass – parade, in chronological succession and in real living catechesis, prophets, kings, eminent figures, symbols and biblical paintings of the Old Testament. In essence, in this way it is figured the Alliance of God with his people – “You shall be my people” – and prefigured the New Covenant which will be sealed with the blood of Christ.

Lord’s “Ecce Homo” (or of the “fogaréus”) Procession 
Organized since ancient times by the confraternity of Mercy, this procession, in the night of Maundy Thursday or "Endoenças", evokes the trial of Jesus, while celebrating the mercy that He taught. Opens the procession the exotic group of “farricocos” with their “matracas” (noisemaker) and “fogaréus” (high pieces with fire). The image of the Lord “Ecce Homo” represents Christ who stated himself as King and who Pilate ridiculed by putting a sham sceptre in his hands and showing him to the crowd with the words “Behold the man!”
Besides many allegorical figures of the supper and the trial of Jesus, since 2004 the procession incorporates floats of the fourteen works of mercy, as well as historical figures related to the foundation and history of Mercies, especially the Mercy of Braga. Since a few years ago it also incorporates several confraternities of the Mercy from various regions of Portugal.

Burial’s “teofórica” procession 
This impressive procession, characteristic of the Braga’s Ritual and performed inside the Cathedral, in the afternoon of Good Friday (after celebrated the Jesus death that however is alive), the Blessed Sacrament, closed on a bier covered with a black mantle, is taken from the “Horto” (garden, place of Jesus agony) where he had been the previous day, by the naves of the Cathedral – hence the name “teofórica” procession (which carries God) – and deposed in proper place for the veneration of the faithful. The escorts cover the face in a sign of mourning. Two little boys or two ladies, alternating with singings of the choir, sing in Latin: “Heu! Heu! Domine! Heu! Heu! Salvator noster!” (Oh! oh! My Lord! Oh! oh! Our Savior!).

Lord’s Burial Procession 
Organized by the Cathedral Chapter, by the confraternities of the Mercy and of Holy Cross, and by the committee on Holy week, this stately procession – one of the most solemn and touching – takes the bier of the slain Lord through the city streets. It is accompanied by those and other confraternities, by the Knights of the Sovereign Military Order of Malta and of the Order of the Holy Sepulchre of Jerusalem, by the Chapter of the Cathedral and by numerous authorities. Integrated also in the procession is the platform with the Holy Cross and another one with Our Lady of Sorrows. In a sign of mourning, the canons and members of Confraternities go with their heads covered. To show their pain, the allegorical figures bearing a veil of mourning. The blackjacks or "farricocos" go silent. The flags and banners, with borders in mourning, creep on the ground.

Resurrection Procession 
Exclusive to the Braga Ritual, this interior procession through the naves of the Cathedral carries the white Host – previously removed from the coffin where it had been placed the day before – displayed in a monstrance. After the procession, the white Host, as Christ resuscitated and alive, blesses the faithful, while these singing “He is risen! He is risen!”, as well as Regina Coeli, laetare (Queen of Heaven, rejoice), as a way of giving congratulations to the Lady of Sorrows who has become the Lady of Joy.

Particularities and curiosities

Lenten “Lausperene” 
The city of Braga retains this ancient tradition of, in the course of Lent, exposing every day the Blessed Sacrament to the adoration of the faithful, since the beginning of the morning until the evening, successively passing from church to church. It is a devotion created in 1710 by the Archbishop Rodrigo de Moura Teles; and very assumed both by the churches who strive in the art of floral adornment of its galleries and altars and by many people, believers of all ages and conditions, which are rushing to visit the Lord exposed.

“Calvários” 
They are frameworks representing the eight “steps” of Christ on the road to Calvary, which are dispersed across various locations in the city of Braga and are the property of the confraternity of the Holy Cross. They are kept closed throughout the year, but during the Holy week they are opened and decorated with shrubs and flowers.

Decoration of the city 
Throughout the month preceding Easter, the city of Braga, particularly in its historic center, is artistically decorated by arches, street pendants, posters and outdoor art. Since 2004, the popular style of these decorations (guided by Master José Veiga) was replaced by a more elaborate and erudite design style.

“Farricocos” and “fogaréus” 
The “farricocos” are exotic figures roughly dressed in black tunics, (“balandraus”) surrounded by a rope, wearing identical cloth hoods with two holes in front of the eyes, crowns of sisal encircling the head and barefooted. This dress is a sign of penitence, inspired by the Old Testament (cf. Jo 3,8) and comes from the old “processions of Penitence”. On Holy Thursday they roam the city streets shaking their wooden rattles or “ruge-ruge”, mounted on top of black sticks, and spinning. In the “Ecce Homo” procession the “farricocos” go ahead, opening the procession: some of them occasionally spin their rattles, while others wield the “fogaréus”. Thus, they recall times when their predecessors walked through the streets calling the public “sinners” to the “endoença”, that is, the Church's forgiveness. Their way of dressing is, on the one hand, a sign of penance and, on the other hand, serves to hide their identities. In the Lord's Burial procession, the “farricocos” also go ahead opening the procession, but quietly and dragging the rattles on the ground and with the “fogaréus” removed. The “fogaréus” are metallic bowls, lifted by high black sticks, and containing burning pine cones emitting large flames. Some “farricocos” accompany the “fogaréus” with baskets of pine cones to refuel the fire. As a whole, they are exotic and impressive figures, which became, for many people, a hallmark of Holy Week in Braga.

“Teofórica” Procession 
See its brief description before.

Paschal Visit 
It is a very rooted custom in the North of Portugal, on Easter Sunday. A group of people (“Compasso”), whenever possible chaired by a priest, with festive costumes, departing from their parish church with a decked cross go to visit Christian families to announce the Christ resurrection and to bless their homes. Ring the bells in sign of joy, carpets of flowers are made through the streets and paths, and rockets explode in the air.

To visit 
In addition to the monuments, gardens and streets of the historic city center of Braga, a particularly popular visitor attraction is the sanctuary of Bom Jesus do Monte. Being a grandiose work of the architect Carlos Amarante, begun in 1784 and completed in 1811, the Bom Jesus do Monte is unique in the world, as an artistic arrangement of mountain – architectural, sculptural and landscaping – a Baroque masterpiece of Braga, a candidate for “World Heritage” status, and a singular testimony of devotion. With the chapels of its monumental staircase, exhibiting in a sculptural way the Stations of the Cross, culminating in the beautiful temple with the scene of the crucifixion, located in its altarpiece, and concluding with the stations of the luminous way of the mysteries of the Risen, this set was intended by the Archbishop Rodrigo de Moura Teles to tangibly symbolise that devotion.

See also
Catholic Church in Portugal
Holy Week procession

References

Bibliography 
 CARDOSO, José (Introdução e versão anotada), Egéria – Peregrinações aos Lugares Santos do Médio Oriente, Edições APPACDM, Braga 1999.
 COSTA, Luís, Braga – Solenidades da Semana Santa, Editora Elo, Mafra 2002. Muito ilustrado, e com texto em português e inglês.
 COUTINHO, Jorge, “A Semana Santa de Braga e a Santa Casa da Misericórdia”, in revista Misericórdia de Braga nº 7 (2011) 13-44.
 FIGUEIREDO, Antero de, O Braguês, seguido de A Procissão dos Fogaréus, revisão de Ana Margarida Dias, Fundação Cultural Bracara Augusta, Braga 2000.
 MARIANO, Alexandra B., e NASCIMENTO, Aires A., Egéria. Viagem do Ocidente à Terra Santa, Edições Colibri, Lisboa 1998.
 MATOS, Sebastião, Breve nota das procissões da Semana Santa de Braga, Ed. do Autor, Areias de Vilar (Barcelos) 2003.
 OLIVEIRA, Eduardo Pires de, A Freguesia de São Victor – Braga, Edição da Junta de Freguesia de S. Victor, Braga 2001, pp. 198–200.

Braga
Holy Week
Tourism in Portugal